Group B of the WABA League took place between 29 September 2021 and it will end on 21 December 2021.

The four best ranked teams advanced to the SuperLeague.

Standings

Fixtures and results
All times given below are in Central European Time (for the match played in Bulgaria is time expressed in Eastern European Time).

Game 1

Game 2

Game 3

Game 4

Game 5

Game 6

Game 7

Game 8

Game 9

Game 10

References

External links
Official website

Group B
2021–22 in Serbian basketball
2021–22 in Bosnia and Herzegovina basketball
2021–22 in Bulgarian basketball
2021–22 in Croatian basketball
2021–22 in Slovenian basketball